Tommy Lindholm (born 3 February 1947) is a Finnish former footballer. He was the head coach of the Finland national football team from 1993 to 1994. He also coached TPS (1978, 1986–1988, 1991) and HJK (1996).

He earned 43 caps at international level between 1965 and 1974, scoring 11 goals.

At club level Lindholm played for PIF, TuTo, TPS, HIFK, Reipas, Beşiktaş and TuPa.

Honours

Finnish Championship: 1968, 1975
Mestaruussarja Top Scorer: 1967, 1968

References

External link

1947 births
Finnish footballers
Finland international footballers
Finnish football managers
Finland national football team managers
Helsingin Jalkapalloklubi managers
Turun Palloseura footballers
Beşiktaş J.K. footballers
Finnish expatriate footballers
Expatriate footballers in Turkey
Living people
Mestaruussarja players
Turun Toverit players
Association football forwards
People from Pargas
Sportspeople from Southwest Finland
Pargas Idrottsförening players